Kazem Hasan (born 9 February 1961) is a Kuwaiti fencer. He competed in the individual and team épée events at the 1980 and 1984 Summer Olympics.

References

External links
 

1961 births
Living people
Kuwaiti male épée fencers
Olympic fencers of Kuwait
Fencers at the 1980 Summer Olympics
Fencers at the 1984 Summer Olympics